Irwin Pakula (December 4, 1897 – May 1988) was an American lawyer and politician from New York.

Life
He was born on December 4, 1897, in Poland. The family emigrated to the United States when Irwin was still a child. He attended the public schools in New York City, and DeWitt Clinton High School. He graduated B.A. from the College of the City of New York, and J.D. from New York University School of Law. He practiced law in New York City, and entered politics as a Republican.

Pakula was a member of the New York State Senate(7th D.) in 1947 and 1948. In 1947, he co-sponsored, with Assemblyman Malcolm Wilson, the Wilson Pakula Act. In November 1948, he ran for re-election, but was defeated by Democrat William N. Conrad.

In November 1956, Pakula defeated the incumbent Democratic State Senator James G. Sweeney, and was again a member of the State Senate in 1957 and 1958. In November 1958, Pakula ran for re-election, but was defeated by Democrat Seymour R. Thaler.

He died in May 1988, in Lake Worth, Palm Beach County, Florida.

Sources

1897 births
1988 deaths
People from Queens, New York
Republican Party New York (state) state senators
DeWitt Clinton High School alumni
Congress Poland emigrants to the United States
New York University School of Law alumni
20th-century American politicians